Aderholdt's Mill was built about 1839 near Jacksonville, Alabama. The 2-1/2 story brick mill is built in a hillside, originally with an overshot millwheel, replaced by an undershot turbine about 1936. It was built by Thomas Crutchfield for Thomas Riley Williams on an offshoot of Little Tallasseehatchie Creek for $2000, replacing a mill that had burned. It was sold in 1853 to James A. Stevenson. After a series of transactions the mill was purchased by James E. Aderholdt, who operated it with the new turbine until 1976. The mill and its machinery remain intact.

Aderholdt's Mill was placed on the National Register of Historic Places on December 29, 1988.

References

External links

Aderholdt Mill at the Encyclopedia of Alabama]

National Register of Historic Places in Calhoun County, Alabama
Industrial buildings completed in 1836
Historic American Buildings Survey in Alabama
Industrial buildings and structures on the National Register of Historic Places in Alabama